Shuibu Station is a metro station of Line 2 of the Fuzhou Metro. It is located near the intersection of Gutian Road and Jianhua Branch Lane, Gulou District, Fuzhou, Fujian, China. It started operation on April 26, 2019.

Station layout

Exits

References 

Railway stations in China opened in 2019
Fuzhou Metro stations